Baba Rokneddin Beyzayi was a Persian mystic and poet in 8th century.

See also
Baba Tahir

References

Iranian Sufis
Iranian Muslim mystics